Tiina Randlane (born on 10 September 1953) is an Estonian mycologist, lichenologist.

References

1953 births
Living people
Estonian mycologists
Place of birth missing (living people)
Lichenologists
University of Tartu alumni
Estonian women scientists